"Soul Finger" is the first single released by R&B group the Bar-Kays. It was issued by Stax Records on the Volt Records label on April 14, 1967.

Background
The song was written by the Bar-Kays while they were rehearsing with Norman West to perform a cover of J. J. Jackson's "But It's Alright". It begins with the melody of the popular children's song "Mary Had a Little Lamb" and then cuts into the main riff, punctuated with a high trumpet trill. It features a chorus of neighborhood children who had been loitering outside the recording studio; they were instructed to shout "Soul Finger!" and were paid with Coca-Cola. The idea for the title and the shouts came from the Stax songwriters Isaac Hayes and David Porter.  The track was used as the opening theme tune to BBC Radio 1 DJ Stuart Henry's shows from 1969 to 1974.

Chart performance
"Soul Finger" was a hit in the United States, peaking at number 3 on the U.S. Billboard R&B singles chart and number 17 on the Billboard Hot 100. The B-side of the single was "Knucklehead", written by Booker T. Jones and Steve Cropper, which reached number 28 on the R&B singles chart and number 76 on the Hot 100. "Soul Finger" and "Knucklehead" were the first two tracks of the Bar-Kays' first LP, Soul Finger, issued on July 10, after nine more tracks had been recorded on June 23.

References

1967 songs
1967 debut singles
1960s instrumentals
Stax Records singles
The Blues Brothers songs